Ann Knox is a Canadian former film actress, who won the Canadian Film Award for Best Actress in 1971 for her performance in The Only Thing You Know.

Despite her award win, the film had limited commercial release and Knox took no other known acting roles.

Knox was originally from Guelph, Ontario. At the time of her award win, she worked primarily as an art teacher at Victoria Park Collegiate in Toronto, Ontario; by 1975, she was co-owner of a wool and fabric shop with branches in Toronto and Vancouver, British Columbia.

References

External links

20th-century Canadian actresses
Canadian film actresses
Canadian art educators
Best Actress Genie and Canadian Screen Award winners
Actresses from Ontario
People from Guelph
Possibly living people